Statistics of Swedish football Division 2 for the 1957–58 season.

League standings

Division 2 Norrland 1957–58

Division 2 Svealand 1957–58

Division 2 Östra Götaland 1957–58

Division 2 Västra Götaland 1957–58

Allsvenskan promotion playoffs 
Skellefteå AIK - Hammarby IF 2-6 (0-0, 2-6)
Örgryte IS - Landskrona BoIS 6-0 (5-0, 1-0)

Hammarby IF and Örgryte IS promoted to Allsvenskan.

References
Sweden - List of final tables (Clas Glenning)

Swedish Football Division 2 seasons
2
Sweden